Corigliano may refer to:

Places
Corigliano Calabro, a place in the Province of Cosenza, Calabria, Italy
Corigliano d'Otranto, a municipality in the Province of Lecce, Apulia, Italy
Corigliano-Rossano, a municipality in the province of Cosenza, Calabria, Italy

People
Enzo Corigliano (born 1997), French squash player
John Corigliano (born 1938), American composer of classical music

See also
 Cornigliano, a quarter of Genoa, Italy